Carniella tsurui is a species of comb-footed spider in the family Theridiidae. It is found in Taiwan.

References

Theridiidae
Spiders described in 2007